United States v. Curtiss-Wright Export Corp., 299 U.S. 304 (1936), was a decision of the United States Supreme Court concerning the foreign affairs powers of the President of the United States. It held that the President, as the nation's "sole organ" in international relations, was therefore innately vested with significant powers over foreign affairs, far exceeding those permitted in domestic matters or accorded to the U.S. Congress. The Court's majority reasoned that although the U.S. Constitution does not explicitly provide for such authority, the powers are implicit in the President's constitutional role as commander-in-chief and head of the executive branch.

Curtiss-Wright was the first decision to establish that the President's plenary power is independent of congressional permission. It is credited with providing the legal precedent for further expansions of executive power in the foreign sphere.

Background
In June 1932, the Chaco War broke out between Paraguay and Bolivia. Both belligerents were poor and relied on outside military assistance, which aroused interest among American armament manufacturers. However, in response to national antiwar sentiment, widespread revulsion at the conduct of the war, and diplomatic pressure from the United Kingdom and the League of Nations, the US government sought to terminate any developing arms trade. 

To that end, on May 24, 1934, the US Congress approved a joint resolution providing that "if the President finds that the prohibition of the sale of arms and munitions of war in the United States to those countries engaged in conflict in the Chaco may contribute to the establishment of peace between those countries," he was authorized to proclaim an embargo on American arms shipments to the belligerents with violators subject to a fine, imprisonment, or both. The same day, US President Franklin Roosevelt signed the joint resolution and issued a proclamation reaffirming its language and establishing an embargo. On November 14, 1935, that proclamation was revoked. 

Curtiss-Wright Export Corp. was indicted for violating both the joint resolution and the embargo by conspiring to sell aircraft machine guns to Bolivia. It demurred to the indictment by arguing that the embargo and proclamation were void, as Congress had unconstitutionally delegated legislative power to the executive branch and thus given the President "unfettered discretion" to make a decision that should have been determined by Congress.

Issues
The defendant raised several issues for consideration by the Court:
 Did the joint resolution passed by Congress grant unconstitutional authority and legislative power to the President in violation of the non-delegation doctrine?
 Was the President required by considerations of due process to make findings of fact in support of the proclamation?
 Did the revocation of the May 1934 proclamation eliminate the penalty for its violation?

Decision
In a 7–1 decision authored by Justice George Sutherland, the Court ruled that the U.S. government, through the President, is categorically allowed great foreign affairs powers that are independent of the US Constitution:

The Constitution does not explicitly state that all ability to conduct foreign policy is vested in the President, but the Court concluded that such power is given implicitly since the executive of a sovereign nation is by its very nature empowered to conduct foreign affairs. The Court found "sufficient warrant for the broad discretion vested in the President to determine whether the enforcement of the statute will have a beneficial effect upon the reestablishment of peace in the affected countries." In other words, the President is better suited to determine the actions and the policies that best serve the nation's interests abroad:

By contrast, Congress lacks such an inherent role under the Constitution, which accords broad discretion to the President alone because of the vastness and the complexity of international relations.

Legacy 
The ruling not only upheld export limitations on the grounds of national security but also established the broader principle of executive supremacy in national security and in foreign affairs; this was one of the reasons advanced in the 1950s for the nearly successful attempt to add the Bricker Amendment to the U.S. Constitution.

The Court has not recognized the full scope of executive power suggested by Justice Sutherland's sweeping language; consequently, it has sometimes presented contradictory rulings about foreign policy powers between the President and the Congress. For example, Reagan v. Wald (1984), established that congressional authorization may be necessary to legitimize many executive acts: Citing Curtiss-Wright, the Court upheld the constitutionality of the president's regulations restricting travel to Cuba expressly on the grounds that they had been authorized by Congress. On the other hand, in Federal Energy Administration v. Algonquin SNG, Inc. (1976), the Court validated presidential restrictions on oil imports based on the very broad congressional language that delegated apparently unlimited regulatory authority to the executive branch.

Despite its controversy, Curtiss-Wright is among the Supreme Court's most influential decisions. Most cases involving conflicts between the executive and legislative branches involve political questions that the courts refuse to adjudicate. Therefore, the sweeping language of Curtiss-Wright is regularly cited to support the executive branch's claims of power to act without congressional authorization in foreign affairs, especially if there is no judicial intervention to interpret the text's meaning.

See also
 List of United States Supreme Court cases, volume 299
 Little v. Barreme

References

Further reading
 Lofgren, Charles A. "United States v. Curtiss-Wright Export Corporation: An Historical Reassessment." Yale Law Journal  83 (1973): 1+. online

External links

1936 in United States case law
United States Supreme Court cases
United States Supreme Court cases of the Hughes Court
United States foreign relations case law
Bolivia–United States relations
Chaco War
Curtiss-Wright Company
Arms trafficking